Ladislau Koszta (born 2 October 1947) is a Romanian former breaststroke swimmer. He competed in two events at the 1968 Summer Olympics.

References

External links
 

1947 births
Living people
Romanian male breaststroke swimmers
Olympic swimmers of Romania
Swimmers at the 1968 Summer Olympics
Sportspeople from Timișoara